Carallia diplopetala is a species of plant in the Rhizophoraceae family that can be found in China and Vietnam.

References

diplopetala
Near threatened plants
Flora of China
Flora of Vietnam
Taxonomy articles created by Polbot